Clifford George Powell (born 21 February 1968) is an English former professional footballer who played as a defender. He began his career with his hometown club Watford. Unable to break into the first team, he made his professional debut during a loan spell with Hereford United in 1987. He joined Sheffield United in 1988 where he made ten league appearances and had brief loan spells with Doncaster Rovers and Cardiff City before dropping out of professional football.

References

1968 births
Living people
People from Watford
English footballers
Watford F.C. players
Hereford United F.C. players
Sheffield United F.C. players
Doncaster Rovers F.C. players
Cardiff City F.C. players
English Football League players
Association football defenders